The 1982 New Brunswick general election was held on October 12, 1982, to elect 58 members to the 50th New Brunswick Legislative Assembly, the governing house of the province of New Brunswick, Canada. It saw Richard Hatfield's Progressive Conservative Party win its largest majority ever to that time. (Bernard Lord beat this record in 1999.)

Background
The Opposition Liberal Party had changed leaders four times since the eve of the 1978 election. It chose Doug Young just months before the vote in a divisive contest that came down to a final ballot against Joseph A. Day.

Campaign
The PCs ran two separate campaigns - one in English and one in French. The francophone campaign, which was mostly run by Hatfield's French lieutenant Jean-Maurice Simard, began with the Grand Ralliement, a symposium on language rights which took place in Shippagan ten days before the election call. Over 400 notable Acadians and other francophones attended. The dual campaigns were remarkably separate from each other, and in some cases contradictory: the English campaign revolved around attacking Doug Young's economic record, while the French campaign pointed out Hatfield's role working with Liberal Prime Minister Pierre Trudeau in enshrining francophone rights in the Charter of Rights and Freedoms.

The Liberals, divided by their recent leadership contest, ran a lackluster campaign which allowed Hatfield's and Simard's overtures to the Acadian population to carry many seats that had been Liberal strongholds for generations, including 10 of 21 Acadian ridings. The Parti Acadien made its last appearance, as the Conservatives adopted several key points of their former platform.

The New Democratic Party of New Brunswick elected Bob Hall as its first ever Member of the Legislative Assembly. He was later joined by a second NDP MLA, Peter Trites, in a by-election.

Results

Results by riding

North 

Consisting of Victoria, Madawaska, Restigouche and Gloucester county ridings.

|-
|bgcolor=whitesmoke|Victoria-Tobique
||
|J. Douglas Moore 3,015
|
|Maurice A. Dionne 2,556
|
|Earl W. Christensen 333
|
|
||
|J. Douglas Moore
|-
|bgcolor=whitesmoke|Grand Falls
|
|Bessie Cote 2,017
||
|Everard H. Daigle 3,129
|
|Patricia Morrell 155
|
|
||
|Everard H. Daigle
|-
|bgcolor=whitesmoke|Madawaska-les-Lacs
||
|Jean-Pierre Ouellet 3,071
|
|Luc Daigle 2,545
|
|Rino Pelletier 176
|
|
||
|Jean-Pierre Ouellet
|-
|bgcolor=whitesmoke|Madawaska Centre
|
|Jacques Tremblay 1,152
||
|Gérald Clavette 2,774
|
|Rodolphe Martin 241
|
|
||
|Gérald Clavette
|-
|bgcolor=whitesmoke|Edmundston
||
|Jean-Maurice Simard 3,393
|
|Laurier Levesque 2,572
|
|Louise Winchester 426
|
|
||
|Jean-Maurice Simard
|-
|bgcolor=whitesmoke|Madawaska South
||
|Percy Mockler 2,561
|
|Héliodore Côté 2,108
|
|Paul Murphy 87
|
|
||
|Héliodore Côté
|-
|bgcolor=whitesmoke|Restigouche West
||
|Yvon Poitras 2,885
|
|Alfred J. Roussel 2,680
|
|
|
|Armand Ploudre (Parti acadien) 1,195
||
|Alfred J. Roussel
|-
|bgcolor=whitesmoke|Campbellton
||
|Fernand G. Dubé 3,917
|
|Lumina Senechal 2,467
|
|John F. "Lofty" MacMillan 556
|
|
||
|Fernand G. Dubé
|-
|bgcolor=whitesmoke|Dalhousie
|
|A.R. Sandy MacLean 1,866
||
|Allan Maher 3,179
|
|Bertha Huard 621
|
|Réal Gendron (Parti acadien) 91
||
|Allan Maher
|-
|bgcolor=whitesmoke|Restigouche East
|
|Aurèle Desrosiers 2,012
||
|Rayburn Donald Doucett 2,418
|
|Wayne Lapointe 507
|
|
||
|Rayburn Donald Doucett
|-
|bgcolor=whitesmoke|Nigadoo-Chaleur
|
|Daniel Comeau 2,601
||
|Pierre Godin 4,057
|
|Rhéal Boudreau 996
|
|André Blanchard (Parti acadien) 174
||
|Pierre Godin
|-
|bgcolor=whitesmoke|Nepisiguit-Chaleur
|
|Patrice Battah 1,502
||
|Frank Branch 3,510
|
|Sherwood Scott 634
|
|Léon Losier (Parti acadien) 205
||
|Frank Branch
|-
|bgcolor=whitesmoke|Bathurst
|
|Jim MacLaggan 2,820
||
|Paul Kenny 3,406
|
|Kevin Mann, Jr. 2,352
|
|
||
|Paul Kenny
|-
|bgcolor=whitesmoke|Caraquet
||
|Emery Robichaud 4,619
|
|Onil Doiron 3,733
|
|Yvon Roy 271
|
|Louise Blanchard (Parti acadien) 966
||
|Onil Doiron
|-
|bgcolor=whitesmoke|Shippagan-les-Îles
||
|Jean Gauvin 5,238
|
|André Robichaud 3,487
|
|
|
|Laval Auclair (Parti acadien) 113
||
|Jean Gauvin
|-
|bgcolor=whitesmoke|Tracadie
|
|Henri Thomas 3,440
||
|Doug Young 5,308
|
|
|
|Michael Blanchard (Parti acadien) 301Fernand Losier (Ind.) 193
||
|Doug Young
|}

Central 
Consisting of Carleton, York, Sunbury and Northumberland county ridings.

|-
|bgcolor=whitesmoke|Carleton North
||
|Charles G. Gallagher 2,189
|
|Robert D. MacElwain 1,725
|
|Larry Lamont 240
|
|
||
|Charles G. Gallagher
|-
|bgcolor=whitesmoke|Carleton Centre
||
|Richard B. Hatfield 2,266
|
|David E. Crouse 1,976
|
|L. William Maxon 128
|
|
||
|Richard B. Hatfield
|-
|bgcolor=whitesmoke|Carleton South
||
|Steven P. Porter 2,811
|
|Stephen A.R. "Steve" Paget 1,534
|
|Arthur L. Slipp 451
|
|
||
|Steven P. Porter
|-
|bgcolor=whitesmoke|York North
||
|David Bishop 4,278
|
|John Hildebrand 3,667
|
|Elizabeth Weir 1,115
|
|
||
|David Bishop
|-
|bgcolor=whitesmoke|York South
||
|Les Hull 5,289
|
|Ralph Annis 3,933
|
|Dan Weston 664
|
|
||
|Les Hull
|-
|bgcolor=whitesmoke|Fredericton South
||
|Dave Clark 5,507
|
|Steve Patterson 4,369
|
|Tom Good 1,716
|
|Harry John Marshall (Ind.) 87
||
|Bud Bird†
|-
|bgcolor=whitesmoke|Fredericton North
||
|Edwin G. Allen 6,392
|
|Bob C. Chase 3,384
|
|Nancy MacFarland 958
|
|
||
|Edwin G. Allen
|-
|bgcolor=whitesmoke|Sunbury
||
|Horace Smith 3,192
|
|Michael Edward McTiernan 2,680
|
|Anna Trefry 401
|
|
||
|Horace Smith
|-
|bgcolor=whitesmoke|Oromocto
||
|Joe Mombourquette 2,583
|
|LeRoy Washburn 2,534
|
|
|
|
||
|LeRoy Washburn
|-
|bgcolor=whitesmoke|Southwest Miramichi
|
|Sterling Hambrook 2,343
||
|Morris Green 3,225
|
|John Barry 244
|
|Floyd Wilson (Ind.) 183
||
|Morris Green
|-
|bgcolor=whitesmoke|Miramichi-Newcastle
||
|Paul Dawson 3,461
|
|John McKay 2,988
|
|Jerry Dunnett 761
|
|
||
|John McKay
|-
|bgcolor=whitesmoke|Chatham
|
|John J. Barry 2,537
||
|Frank J. McKenna 2,618
|
|John T. McLaughlin 633
|
|
||
|Frank Kane†
|-
|bgcolor=whitesmoke|Bay du Vin
||
|Roger "Butch" Wedge 2,579
|
|Reg MacDonald 2,462
|
|Harold J. Manual 155
|
|Robert Wilfred Melanson (Parti acadien) 35
||
|Norbert Thériault†
|-
|bgcolor=whitesmoke|Miramichi Bay
||
|James K. "Jim" Gordon 3,263
|
|Alcide Léger 3,051
|
|J. Albert Richardson 275
|
|
||
|Edgar LeGresley†
|}

South West 
Consisting of Queens, Kings, Saint John and Charlotte county ridings.

|-
|bgcolor=whitesmoke|Queens North
||
|Wilfred G. Bishop 1,911
|
|Cyril MacDonald 1,330
|
|Frank Wuhr 212
|
|William Taylor (Ind.) 93
||
|Wilfred G. Bishop
|-
|bgcolor=whitesmoke|Queens South
||
|Robert B. McCready 1,799
|
|Dawn Bremner 1,437
|
|Mike Gormley 212
|
|
||
|Robert B. McCready
|-
|bgcolor=whitesmoke|Kings West
||
|John B. M. Baxter 5,226
|
|Malcolm A. Barry 3,219
|
|George Little 3,034
|
|
||
|John B. M. Baxter
|-
|bgcolor=whitesmoke|Kings Centre
||
|Harold Fanjoy 4,012
|
|Edward Kelly 2,165
|
|Marian Jefferies 1,283
|
|
||
|Harold Fanjoy
|-
|bgcolor=whitesmoke|Kings East
||
|Hazen Elmer Myers 3,808
|
|Gordon A. Lewis 2,161
|
|Mark Connell 1,011
|
|
||
|Hazen Elmer Myers
|-
|bgcolor=whitesmoke|Saint John Fundy
||
|Bev Harrison 3,064
|
|Fred Fuller 1,746
|
|Lawrence D. Hanley 1,585
|
|
||
|Bev Harrison
|-
|bgcolor=whitesmoke|East Saint John
||
|G.S. "Gerry" Merrithew 4,246
|
|Brian Fraser Hurley 2,359
|
|Peter Trites 2,254
|
|
||
|Gerry Merrithew
|-
|bgcolor=whitesmoke|Saint John Harbour
|
|Foster Hammond 1,892
||
|Louis Edward Murphy 2,055
|
|Dee Dee M.A. Daigle 695
|
|
||
|Louis Edward Murphy
|-
|bgcolor=whitesmoke|Saint John South
||
|Nancy Clark Teed 1,890
|
|Brian McCarthy 1,521
|
|David Brown 1,012
|
|
||
|Nancy Clark Teed
|-
|bgcolor=whitesmoke|Saint John Park
|
|Twyla Hartt 1,920
||
|Shirley Dysart 2,247
|
|David T. Pye 727
|
|
||
|Shirley Dysart
|-
|bgcolor=whitesmoke|Saint John North
||
|Eric J. Kipping 2,223
|
|Joseph A. Day 2,078
|
|Erik Kraglund 1,079
|
|
||
|Eric J. Kipping
|-
|bgcolor=whitesmoke|Saint John West
||
|G. M. Keith Dow 4,590
|
|Al Brien 2,701
|
|Barry Robson 1,167
|
|
||
|Rodman Logan†
|-
|bgcolor=whitesmoke|Charlotte-Fundy
||
|James Tucker 2,291
|
|Eric Allaby 1,272
|
|Jim Aucoin 260
|
|
||
|James Tucker
|-
|bgcolor=whitesmoke|Charlotte Centre
|
|Gregory F. Thompson 1,384
||
|Sheldon A. Lee 1,471
|
|Wayne Townsend 217
|
|
||
|Sheldon A. Lee
|-
|bgcolor=whitesmoke|Charlotte West
||
|Leland W. McGaw 1,992
|
|Dave E. Lively 1,237
|
|Joseph N. Hansen 330
|
|
||
|Leland W. McGaw
|-
|bgcolor=whitesmoke|St. Stephen-Milltown
||
|Bob Jackson 2,155
|
|Joel Hansen 1,372
|
|Judy Olsen 243
|
|
||
|Bill Cockburn†
|}

South East 
Consisting of Kent, Westmorland and Albert county ridings.

|-
|bgcolor=whitesmoke|Kent North
|
|Elzée Thebeau 2,129
||
|Conrad Landry 2,750
|
|Charles R. Richard 357
|
|
||
|Joseph Daigle†
|-
|bgcolor=whitesmoke|Kent Centre
|
|Fernand Savoie 1,244
||
|Alan R. Graham 2,691
|
|Derrold H. Barnes 216
|
|Ronald S. MacDonald (Ind.) 77
||
|Alan R. Graham
|-
|bgcolor=whitesmoke|Kent South
||
|Omer Léger 4,829
|
|Bertin LeBlanc 3,732
|
|Gérald Mazerolle 236
|
|
||
|Bertin LeBlanc
|-
|bgcolor=whitesmoke|Shediac
|
|Alfred Landry 4,842
||
|Azor LeBlanc 5,135
|
|Henri-Eugène Duguay 273
|
|Omer Bourque (Parti acadien) 86
||
|Azor LeBlanc
|-
|bgcolor=whitesmoke|Tantramar
|
|Irvin D. Robinson 2,063
|
|John Gideon Carter 1,334
||
|Robert Arthur Hall 2,503
|
|
||
|Lloyd Folkins†
|-
|bgcolor=whitesmoke|Memramcook
||
|Clarence Cormier 4,032
|
|William "Bill" Malenfant 3,951
|
|Ulysse Bastarache 438
|
|
||
|Bill Malenfant
|-
|bgcolor=whitesmoke|Moncton East
|
|Norman H. Crossman 2,688
||
|Ray Frenette 3,817
|
|Raymond Boucher 687
|
|Gilles Frenette (Parti acadien) 165Raymond Leger (Ind.) 75
||
|Ray Frenette
|-
|bgcolor=whitesmoke|Moncton North
|
|Kathryn Barnes 3,032
||
|Mike McKee 4,768
|
|Thomas F. Wilson 802
|
|
||
|Mike McKee
|-
|bgcolor=whitesmoke|Moncton West
||
|Mabel DeWare 4,242
|
|Wayne Patterson 2,892
|
|Brian Harvey 601
|
|
||
|Mabel DeWare
|-
|bgcolor=whitesmoke|Petitcodiac
||
|C.W. "Bill" Harmer 6,388
|
|Hollis Stanley Steeves 3,813
|
|Charles B. Sullivan 1,474
|
|
||
|Bill Harmer
|-
|bgcolor=whitesmoke|Riverview
||
|Brenda M. Robertson 4,949
|
|Jim Anderson 2,151
|
|Ed Foley 582
|
|
||
|Brenda M. Robertson
|-
|bgcolor=whitesmoke|Albert
||
|Malcolm MacLeod 2,827
|
|Gordon L. Rattray 1,360
|
|Gary Wayne Bannister 605
|
|
||
|Malcolm MacLeod
|}

Further reading
 

1982 elections in Canada
Elections in New Brunswick
1982 in New Brunswick
October 1982 events in Canada